State Route 83 is a north–south state highway in the U.S. state of Ohio.  Its southern terminus is near the town of Beverly at State Route 60, and its northern terminus is overlooking Lake Erie at U.S. Route 6 in Avon Lake.

A portion of SR 83 is part of the Morgan County Scenic Byway.

History

In 1972, the highway was certified as State Route 83 when this designation replaced that of State Route 76 (which was removed to prevent confusion with Interstate 76 after its completion).  At this time, the designation was also routed along a new divided highway south and west of Coshocton.

SR 83 was planned to be relocated in Lorain County, but only two short segments of this relocation were built, at Interstate 90/State Route 2 and at State Route 10, with the rest of the plans abandoned after 1991. The latter segment carries part of SR 83C.

Before 1960
The original route of SR 83 was established in 1923 from Ashtabula to the Pennsylvania state line south of Conneaut. It was then rerouted through Kingsville (village east of Ashtabula) along the current State Route 84 alignment in 1926. SR 83 was rerouted again from Ashtabula to Kelloggsville (village south of Conneaut) along previously unnumbered roads in 1938; alignment through Kingsville certified as State Route 84.
In 1960, the route was decertified.

Major Junctions

Route 83C
Route 83C is an unsigned, ¾-mile route connecting SR 83 with SR 10 in North Ridgeville and Eaton Township. SR 83C runs southwest from SR 83 along Lorain Road and Butternut Ridge Road, then turns northwest, intersecting SR 10 then ending just beyond at Chestnut Ridge Road. The latter road is one of the two constructed segments of the once-proposed relocation of SR 83. The route is marked "To SR 10/I-480/I-80" westbound and "To SR 83" eastbound. (SR 83 as it has remained has not received direct access to SR 10.)

References

External links

083
Transportation in Washington County, Ohio
Transportation in Morgan County, Ohio
Transportation in Noble County, Ohio
Transportation in Guernsey County, Ohio
Transportation in Muskingum County, Ohio
Transportation in Coshocton County, Ohio
Transportation in Holmes County, Ohio
Transportation in Wayne County, Ohio
Transportation in Medina County, Ohio
Transportation in Lorain County, Ohio
Scenic byways in Ohio